This is a list of newspapers currently published in Saint Kitts and Nevis.

Weekly
The St. Kitts-Nevis Observer – Basseterre
The Labour Spokesman – Basseterre

Official
 St. Kitts and Nevis Information Service (SKNIS) – government press releases

News websites
 Nevis Pages – Charlestown 
 My Vue News – Basseterre
 SKN Newsline – online TV news, Basseterre
 SKN Pulse – Basseterre
 SKN Vibes – Basseterre
 SKN List – Basseterre
 St. Kitts Gazette – Basseterre

Defunct newspapers
Opron Star

See also
 List of newspapers

References

Saint Kitts and Nevis
List